Dawn on the Great Divide is a 1942 American Western film directed by Howard Bretherton based on James Oliver Curwood's 1913 short story "Wheels of Fate". It was the final film of Buck Jones and the final film of Monogram Pictures Rough Riders film series. Colonel Tim McCoy was recalled up for military service in World War II and is not present in the film.

Plot
The Rough Riders protect a wagon train and supplies for the railroad against a power hungry businessman who dresses his army of henchmen as Indians.

Cast 
Buck Jones as Buck Roberts
Mona Barrie as Sadie Rand
Raymond Hatton as Sandy Hopkins
Robert Lowery as Terry Wallace
Rex Bell as Jack Carson
Maude Eburne as Sarah Harkins
Christine McIntyre as Mary Harkins, Sarah's Daughter
Betty Blythe as Mrs. Elmira Corkle
Robert Frazer as Judge John Corkle
Harry Woods as Jim Corkle the Judge's Brother
Tristram Coffin as Matt Rand
Lee Shumway as Joe Wallace, Rail Road Official
Roy Barcroft as Chuck Loder
Steve Clark as Alex Kirby, Carson's Messinger
Warren Jackson as Fred Cooke, Bartender
 Silver as Buck's horse

Soundtrack 
 Mona Barrie - Rock of Ages
 Christine McIntyre and Robert Lowery - Beautiful Dreamer

External links 

1942 films
Monogram Pictures films
American black-and-white films
Films based on short fiction
1942 Western (genre) films
American Western (genre) films
Films based on works by James Oliver Curwood
Films directed by Howard Bretherton
1940s English-language films
1940s American films